Doña Manuela Sánchez de Tagle y Sánchez de Tagle, 3rd Marchioness of Altamira was a Spanish-Mexican aristocrat.

Early life 
Doña Manuela was the daughter of Don Pedro Sánchez de Tagle, 2nd Marquis of Altamira and Doña Luisa Sánchez de Tagle, daughter of Don Luis Sánchez de Tagle, 1st Marquis of Altamira. Her parent are first cousins, making her a product of inbreeding.

Family 
Doña Manuela married on April 12, 1714, Don Pedro Pérez de Tagle, a distant relative and a member of the House of Tagle. Together they had a daughter, Doña Luisa Pérez de Tagle y Sánchez de Tagle.
She succeeded her father Don Pedro and became the 3rd Marchioness of Altamira.
The marquesa and her husband continued on the family business and enriched the Hacienda Cuisillos, which was the prime distributor of tequila in New Spain.

She was succeeded by her only daughter Doña Luisa Pérez de Tagle, who became the 4th Marchioness of Altamira

References
 Tagle. Enigma de un nombre, Historia de un pueblo. Author: José Luis Sáiz Fernández
 Nobleza Colonial de Chile. Author: J. Mujica
 Diccionario Heráldico y Genealógico de Apellidos Españoles. Author: Alberto y Arturo García Garrafa
 Nobiliario de los reinos y Señorios de España. Author: Francisco Piferrer
 La Sociedad Chilena del siglo XVIII, Mayorazgos y Títulos de Castilla. Author: Domingo Amunátegui Solar
 Patrons, Partisans, and Palace intrigues: the court society of Colonial Mexico. Author: Christoph Rosenmüller

External links
 http://gw5.geneanet.org/index.php3?b=sanchiz&lang=es;p=manuela;n=sanchez+de+tagle+sanchez+de+tagle
 http://gw1.geneanet.org/index.php3?b=fracarbo&lang=en;p=jose+bernardo;n=de+tagle+bracho+y+perez+de+la+riva
 https://web.archive.org/web/20090220114504/http://per-can.com/CarpD/deTagle/deTagle.htm#Biografia
 http://www.ianchadwick.com/tequila/16-17th%20centuries.htm

18th-century Spanish nobility
Marquesses of Altamira